The Japan national football team in 2015; managed by head coach Javier Aguirre compete in the 2015 AFC Asian Cup, and managed by head coach Vahid Halilhodžić compete in the 2018 FIFA World Cup qualification (AFC) and 2015 EAFF East Asian Cup in amongst international friendly matches both at home and abroad.

Record

Kits

Schedule

Players statistics

Goalscorers

External links
Japan Football Association

Japan national football team results
2015 in Japanese football
Japan